Ralyn M. Hill (May 6, 1899 – March 25, 1977) was a soldier in the United States Army who received the Medal of Honor for his actions during World War I.

Biography
Hill was born in Lindenwood, Illinois on May 6, 1899, and died March 25, 1977. He is buried in Abilene Cemetery, Abilene, Kansas.

Medal of Honor citation
Rank and organization: Corporal, U.S. Army, Company H, 129th Infantry, 33d Division. Place and date: Near Donnevoux, France, 7 October 1918. Entered service at: Oregon, Ill. Born: 6 May 1899, Lindenwood, Ill. G.O. No.: 34, W.D., 1919.

Citation:

Seeing a French airplane fall out of control on the enemy side of the Meuse River with its pilot injured, Cpl. Hill voluntarily dashed across the footbridge to the side of the wounded man and, taking him on his back, started back to his lines. During the entire exploit he was subjected to murderous fire of enemy machineguns and artillery, but he successfully accomplished his mission and brought his man to a place of safety, a distance of several hundred yards.

See also

List of Medal of Honor recipients
List of Medal of Honor recipients for World War I

References

External links

United States Army Medal of Honor recipients
United States Army non-commissioned officers
United States Army personnel of World War I
People from Ogle County, Illinois
1899 births
Military personnel from Illinois
1977 deaths
World War I recipients of the Medal of Honor
Burials in Kansas